An overview map defines the boundaries of another map within the context of its surrounding areas. It is a generalised view of a geographic area and does not include significant detail.

References

Maps